Nok is a village in Jaba Local Government Area of Kaduna State, Nigeria. The village is an archeological site.

Archaeology
The discovery of terracotta figurines at this location caused its name to be used for the Nok culture, of which these figurines are typical, which flourished in Nigeria in the period 1500 BC - 500 AD.
The artifacts were discovered in 1943 during mining operations.
The archaeologist Bernard Fagg investigated the site, and with the help of locals discovered many other artifacts.
Iron smelting furnaces were also found at Nok.

Occupation dates far before the first iron smelting. A sample of carbonized wood found in the "main paddock" at Nok in 1951 was dated to around 3660 BC though there are questions about the reliability of this conclusion.

References

External links

Archaeological sites in Nigeria
Populated places in Kaduna State
Sacred sites in traditional African religions
Archaeological sites of Western Africa